Depressaria peregrinella is a moth in the family Depressariidae. It was described by Hans-Joachim Hannemann in 1967. It is found in Iran.

References

Moths described in 1967
Depressaria
Moths of Asia